I Am is the second studio album by singer-songwriter Scout Niblett, released on Secretly Canadian records. The album was produced by Steve Albini.

Track listing

Personnel
Scout Niblett - vocals, guitar, drums, ukulele
 Chris Saligoe - guitar
 Pete Schreiner - drums

Technical personnel 
Steve Albini - engineer

References

2003 albums
Scout Niblett albums
Albums produced by Steve Albini